Maximilian Mörseburg (born 22 March 1992) is a German lawyer and politician of the Christian Democratic Union (CDU) who has been serving as a member of the Bundestag since 2021.

Early life and education
Möseburg was born 1992 in the German city of Stuttgart and studied law in order to become a lawyer.

Political career
Möseburg entered the CDU in 2010 and was elected directly to the Bundestag in 2021, representing the Stuttgart II district.

References 

Living people
1992 births
Politicians from Stuttgart
Christian Democratic Union of Germany politicians
Members of the Bundestag 2021–2025
21st-century German politicians